Sophie Kyagulanyi is a human rights activist and lawyer who works for Oxfam in Uganda.

Education 
Kyagulanyi received a Bachelor of Law, at Makerere University where she studied from 1998 to 2001.

Career 
Kyagulanyi worked as Democratic Governance Coordinator for Action Aid Uganda and also  Women in Leadership Programme Manager at Forum for Women in Democracy. She worked as a Legal Research and Advocacy Coordinator with the Foundation for Human Rights Initiative from 2001 to 2005. Kyagulanyi is currently the Governance and Accountability Manager at Oxfam in Uganda. She was a founding member of DefendDefenders and became chairperson in 2019.

Kyagulanyi has several articles and citations. In June 2020, she wrote a blog post titled COVID19 - A reminder why access to water is a human right.

References 

Human rights in Uganda
Makerere University alumni
Ugandan human rights activists